In algebra, given a 2-monad T in a 2-category, a pseudoalgebra for T is a 2-category-version of algebra for T, that satisfies the laws up to coherent isomorphisms.

See also 
Operad

References

External links 
https://ncatlab.org/nlab/show/pseudoalgebra+for+a+2-monad
https://golem.ph.utexas.edu/category/2014/06/codescent_objects_and_coherenc.html

Adjoint functors
Algebra
Category theory